Stychoparmena spinipennis is a species of beetle in the family Cerambycidae, and the only species in the genus Stychoparmena. It was described by Stephan von Breuning in 1939.

References

Parmenini
Beetles described in 1939